Admiral Pisani may refer to:

Andrea Pisani (admiral) (1662–1718), Venetian admiral
Niccolò Pisani (fl.1350–1354), Venetian admiral
Vettor Pisani (1324–1380), Venetian admiral